Butler Area Senior High School is a coeducational public senior high school in Butler, Pennsylvania, United States, serving grades 9–12. It is the senior high school for the Butler Area School District. The school was founded in 1908, moved to a larger building on an adjacent site in 1917, and moved again to its current site in 1960.

History
Butler Senior High School was originally opened in a yellow-brick building on a site bounded by McKean, East North, Cliff, and New Castle Streets in central Butler. In 1917 it moved to a three-story red-brick building across Cliff Street, the original building becoming the junior high school. In 1937 it was named John A. Gibson High School, in honor of the district superintendent who retired that year. In 1960 it moved again, to a new building on Campus Lane. The 1917 building is now the junior high school, with an annex built in 1994–95 occupying the site of the 1908 building.

Extracurricular programs
The Senior High is home to the Butler Golden Tornado athletics teams and offers a variety of clubs, activities and sports.

Marching band
The Butler Golden Tornado Marching Band marches 175 students, who audition for their places.

Junior Reserve Officers Training Corps
Butler High School has an Army J.R.O.T.C. program battalion, the Tornado Battalion.

Notable alumni

Sports

Major League Baseball
 Matt Clement, former MLB pitcher, All-Star, member of 2007 World Series champion Boston Red Sox
 Milt Graff (1930-2005), former MLB second baseman for the Kansas City Athletics (1957-1958) 
 Jerry Meals, current MLB umpire
 John Stuper, former MLB pitcher for the St. Louis Cardinals (1982-1985) and Cincinnati Reds (1985) and current coach of the Yale Bulldogs
 Ed Vargo (1928-2008), MLB umpire (1960s-1970s)

National Football League
 Rich Bartlewski, former NFL tight end for the Los Angeles Raiders (1990) and Atlanta Falcons (1991) 
 Tom Brown (1921-2013), former NFL tight end for the Pittsburgh Steelers (1942) 
 Terry Hanratty, former American football quarterback who played in college at Notre Dame and in the NFL during the 1960s and 1970s, earned two Super Bowl rings with the Pittsburgh Steelers
 Scott Milanovich, former NFL, NFL Europe, XFL, AFL, and CFL quarterback. Coached multiple CFL teams and is the head coach for the Edmonton Eskimos
 Bill Saul (1940-2006), former NFL linebacker for multiple teams (1962-1970). Older brother of Rich and Ron.
 Rich Saul (1948-2012), former NFL center lineman for the Los Angeles Rams (1970-1981). Six-time Pro Bowler. Younger brother of Bill, twin brother of Ron.
 Ron Saul, former NFL guard lineman for the Houston Oilers (1970-1975) and Washington Redskins (1976-1981). Younger brother of Bill, twin brother of Rich.
Paul Uram (1927-2017), American former gymnastics and flexibility coach, member of the U.S. Gymanstics Hall of Fame, coached on four Super Bowl-winning teams with the Pittsburgh Steelers

Sports, other
 Jake Hildebrand, ECHL hockey player for the Kalamazoo Wings
 Harry Holiday, world record-setting swimmer and Armco CEO
 Brian Minto, former heavyweight boxer (2002-2016)
 John Minton (1948–1995), former professional wrestler known by the name Big John Studd. Winner of multiple championship titles. Inductee of the WCW and WWE Hall of fame.
 Eric Namesnik (1970–2006), two-time silver medalist Olympic swimmer for men's 400-meter individual relay (1992 & 1996)
 David Pichler, Olympic diver (1996 & 2000), dive team captain in 2000, did not place 
 Meghan Schnur, is an NSCAA All-American for University of Connecticut (2007) and an American soccer midfielder currently playing for Sky Blue FC of Women's Professional Soccer and member of the United States U-23 women's national soccer team.

Film, Stage & Television
Chester Aaron (1932-2019), author with over two dozen publications  
 Marc Blucas, actor, best known by his portrayal of Riley Finn in Buffy the Vampire Slayer
 Joan Chandler (1923-1979), actress, best known for her roles in Alfred Hitchcock's Rope (1948) with James Stewart and Humoresque (1946) with Joan Crawford.
 Josie Carey (1930-2004), the host of The Children's Corner on WQED in Pittsburgh. Fred Rogers was a puppeteer and musician on her show for seven years before creating Mister Rogers' Neighborhood.
 Barbara Feldon, actress and model, best known for her portrayal of Agent 99 of the TV series Get Smart  
 Grace Gealey, actress, portrayed 'Anika' on the Fox series Empire
 Fred McCarren (1951-2006), actor, best known for his roles in Amanda's (1983) and Hill Street Blues (1984).
 Michele Pawk, Tony Award-winning actress (2003, Best Performance by a Featured Actress in a Play, Hollywood Arms)

Music
 Glenn Crytzer, band leader and composer
 Jim Pugh, jazz trombonist and composer. Distinguished Professor of Jazz Trombone at University of Illinois at Urbana–Champaign. Formerly played with Steely Dan's touring band.
 William Purvis, French horn player, conductor and Musical Instruments Director at Yale University

Public Office and Military
 Gibson E. Armstrong, former Republican PA State Representative for the 100th district (1977-1984) and PA State Senator for the 13th district (1984-2009)
 Judge William G. Bassler, former United States district judge of the United States District Court for the District of New Jersey (1991-2006)
 Brian Ellis, former Republican PA State Representative for the 11th House district (2005-2019)
 Admiral Jonathan W. Greenert, former Chief of Naval Operations for the U.S. Navy (2011-2015)
 Mike Kelly, local businessman and representative for 
 Donald Oesterling (1927-2013), former Democratic PA State Senator
 William J. Perry, American mathematician, engineer, businessman, and civil servant who was the United States Secretary of Defense under President Bill Clinton
 Rick Santorum, American politician, attorney, and political commentator, former United States Senator from Pennsylvania
 Peter Talleri, retired U.S. Marine Corps major general

Technology
 Jay Last, physicist, silicon pioneer, and member of the Traitorous Eight, founding father of Silicon Valley
 Carl Yankowski, businessman and former CEO of Palm, Inc. and Ambient Devices.

Pageants
 Michele McDonald, Miss USA 1971, semi-finalist of Miss Universe 1971

Other
 Daniel D'Aniello, billionaire businessman who co-founded and chaired The Carlyle Group

References

External links
 

Public high schools in Pennsylvania
Schools in Butler County, Pennsylvania
Education in Pittsburgh area
Educational institutions established in 1908
1908 establishments in Pennsylvania